is the second studio album by Japanese band Wagakki Band and the band's first album of original songs. It was released on September 2, 2015 by Avex Trax in five editions: CD only, two music video editions, and two live concert editions with DVD or Blu-ray discs. The live concert editions feature the band's concerts at the Shibuya Public Hall on January 7, 2015 and the ATT Show Box in Taipei on May 10, 2015. In addition, a limited edition  was released, featuring a digital copy of the album and both video editions on a special USB flash drive.

The album features the single "Hangeki no Yaiba", which was produced and mixed by Matt Wallace and featured in the web series Attack on Titan: Counter Rockets. Also included are "Ikusa" and "Nadeshikozakura", which were used as the theme songs of the anime series Samurai Warriors.

Yasou Emaki hit No. 1 on Oricon's albums chart and was certified Gold by the RIAJ. It also earned the band the Good Planning Award at the 57th Japan Record Awards.

Track listing
All tracks are arranged by Wagakki Band.

Personnel 
 Yuko Suzuhana – vocals
 Machiya – guitar, vocals (8)
 Beni Ninagawa – tsugaru shamisen
 Kiyoshi Ibukuro – koto
 Asa – bass
 Daisuke Kaminaga – shakuhachi
 Wasabi – drums
 Kurona – wadaiko

Charts

Certification

References

External links 
 
  (Avex Group)
 
 

Wagakki Band albums
2015 albums
Japanese-language albums
Avex Trax albums